James "Jay" Cooke was an American baseball pitcher in the Negro leagues. He played with the Baltimore Black Sox in 1932. Among available statistics, Cooke had a 2-1 win-loss record with a 4.74 earned run average in 10 games, including a shutout against the Hilldale Club on May 20.

References

External links
 and Seamheads

Baltimore Black Sox players
Year of birth unknown
Year of death unknown
Baseball pitchers